Kyle Sorensen (born June 22, 1986) is a Canadian lacrosse player who plays defense for the Washington Stealth of the National Lacrosse League and the Toronto Nationals of Major League Lacrosse. He played for the Peterborough Lakers before the NLL and attended Bellarmine University before he was drafted into the NLL with the second selection of the 2006 NLL Entry Draft.

Statistics

NLL

References

1986 births
Living people
Bellarmine Knights men's lacrosse players
Canadian lacrosse players
Lacrosse people from Ontario
Major League Lacrosse players
San Jose Stealth players
Sportspeople from Peterborough, Ontario
Hamilton Nationals players